The Great Texas Balloon Race is a hot air balloon festival held each summer near the City of Longview, Texas normally held in the area nearby the East Texas Regional Airport (Also known as the Gregg County Airport). Established in 1978, it's billed as "The longest running hot-air balloon event in Texas."

The 2020 Great Texas Balloon Race was cancelled as a result of the COVID-19 pandemic, but the race was held on 2021 Great Texas Balloon Race.

References

External links 
 

Hot air balloon festivals in the United States
Longview, Texas
Tourist attractions in Gregg County, Texas
1978 establishments in Texas
Recurring events established in 1978